Standards And Recommended Practices (SARPs) are technical specifications adopted by the Council of ICAO in accordance with Article 37 of the Convention on International Civil Aviation in order to achieve "the highest practicable degree of uniformity in regulations, standards, procedures and organization in relation to aircraft, personnel, airways and auxiliary services in all matters in which such uniformity will facilitate and improve air navigation".

SARPs are published by ICAO in the form of Annexes to Chicago Convention. SARPs do not have the same legal binding force as the Convention itself, because Annexes are not international treaties. Moreover States agreed to "undertake to collaborate in securing (...) uniformity", not to "comply with". Each Contracting State may notify the ICAO Council of differences between SARPs and its own regulations and practices. Those differences are published in the form of Supplements to Annexes.

A Standard is defined by ICAO as "any specification for physical characteristics, configuration, material, performance, personnel or procedure, the uniform application of which is recognized as necessary for the safety or regularity of international air navigation and to which Contracting States will conform in accordance with the Convention".

A Recommended Practice is defined by ICAO as "any specification for physical characteristics, configuration, material, performance, personnel or procedure, the uniform application of which is recognized as desirable in the interest of safety, regularity or efficiency of international air navigation and to which Contracting States will endeavour to conform in accordance
with the Convention".

Verification of compliance
ICAO verifies compliance with SARPs through audits of state oversight systems. Currently there are two audit programmes:
 Universal Safety Oversight Audit Programme (USOAP)
 Universal Security Audit Programme (USAP)

References

External links
ICAO Store (official site)
ICAO eLibrary (official site)

International Civil Aviation Organization